Kilcrea railway station was on the Cork and Macroom Direct Railway in County Cork, Ireland.

History

The station opened on 12 May 1866. Regular passenger services were withdrawn on 1 July 1935.

Routes

Further reading

References

Disused railway stations in County Cork
Railway stations opened in 1866
Railway stations closed in 1935
1866 establishments in Ireland
Railway stations in the Republic of Ireland opened in the 19th century